Tulay is a rural locality (a settlement) in Shumilikhinsky Selsoviet, Rebrikhinsky District, Altai Krai, Russia. The population was 108 as of 2013. There are 2 streets.

Geography 
Tulay is located 32 km west of Rebrikha (the district's administrative centre) by road. Shumilikha is the nearest rural locality.

References 

Rural localities in Rebrikhinsky District